The Crystal Rain Forest is an educational puzzle game developed and published by Sherston Software for use in primary schools. It was originally released in 1992 for the Acorn Archimedes.  A later version was released for Microsoft Windows and Mac OS in 1999.

Plot
The game takes place on the planet Oglo. In the kingdom of Azon, the last remaining rainforest is being cut down by the antagonistic "Cut and Run Gang". The king of Azon ordered the Cut and Run Gang to stop threatening the rainforest, and is shortly shot by a poison dart. The two protagonists must take part in a variety of settings and activities to retrieve the magical rainforest crystals to save the king and stop the deforestation of the planet.

Gameplay
The game is presented in a first-person perspective, in which the player has to use various controls and mechanisms to explore the dense rainforests and solve puzzles. The game contains nine fully narrated interactive activities which includes machinery, puzzles, computer programmes and control mechanisms. The player-characters takes part in various scenarios including puzzle solving and programming.

References

1999 video games
Acorn Archimedes games
Children's educational video games
Environmental education video games
Classic Mac OS games
Platform games
Single-player video games
Video games developed in the United Kingdom
Video games set in forests
Video games set on fictional planets
Windows games